ZDFinfo is a German free-to-air documentary television channel owned by ZDF. It was launched on 27 August 1997 as ZDFinfokanal, and later rebranded as ZDFinfo on 5 September 2011. On 1 May 2012, a high-definition simulcast the channel was launched.

ZDF offered another documentary channel, ZDFdokukanal, between 2000 and 2009.

References

External links
  

Publicly funded broadcasters
German-language television networks
Television stations in Germany
Television channels and stations established in 1997
Mass media in Mainz
ZDF